Sawai Madhopur district is a district of Rajasthan state in north-west India. Sawai Madhopur is the chief town and district headquarters. Sawai Madhopur district comes under Bharatpur division.

Geography

Sawai Madhopur District has an area of 10527 km2. It is bounded by Dausa district on the north, Karauli district on the northeast, Sheopur district of Madhya Pradesh to the southeast, Kota and Bundi districts on the south, and Tonk district on the west.

The Aravalli Hills are found in this district, in which is the famous Ranthambore Tiger Reserve. The Chambal River forms the southeastern boundary of the district.

Division
Sawai Madhopur district has 8 revenue subdivisions and tehsils:
Sawai Madhopur
Chauth Ka Barwara
Khandar
Bonli
Malarna Dungar
Gangapur City
 Wazeerpur
Bamanwas

District Court
Sawai Madhopur District Court was established on 1977. Shri O.P. Jain took over the charge of first Sawai Madhopur District & Session Court judge. Presently Sh. Ajai kumar Ojha is the District & Sessions Judge of Sawai Madhopur. There are 10 judges in the Sawai Madhopur District Court.

Economy
In 2006 the Ministry of Panchayati Raj named Sawai Madhopur one of the country's 250 most backward districts (out of a total of 640). It is one of the 12 districts in Rajasthan currently receiving funds from the Backward Regions Grant Fund Programme (BRGF).

Demographics

According to the 2011 census Sawai Madhopur district has a population of 1,335,551, roughly equal to the nation of Mauritius or the US state of Maine. This gives it a ranking of 362nd in India (out of a total of 640). Its population growth rate over the decade 2001-2011 was 19.79%. Sawai Madhopur has a sex ratio of 894 females for every 1000 males, and a literacy rate of 66.19%. 19.95% of the population lives in urban areas. Scheduled Castes and Scheduled Tribes make up 20.87% and 21.40% of the population respectively. The largest community in the district is the Meenas, while the Gurjars are a significant population. Of the Dalits, the Bairwa are the largest population making up approximately half the total SC population.

The District is dominant by Meena community and Gurjars are also in sizeable number. and as per the census of India 2011, Meenas population is 4.85 lakh and Gurjars are 2.15 lac, these both caste play key role in Lok Sabha election. In Tonk-Sawai Madhopur Lok Sabha constituency, Meena voters are 4 lakh, Muslims 2.85 lakh, Gurjars 1.75 lakh, 2.5 lakh General and 3 lakh SC.

At the time of the 2011 Census of India, 92.13% of the population in the district spoke Hindi, 3.60% Rajasthani and 3.08% Urdu as their first language. The main dialect of the district is Dhundari.

Fairs and festivals

Ganesh Chaturthi Fair
Ganesh Chaturthi Fair is the largest fair of Sawai Madhopur. It is organised on Bhadav Shukla Chaturthi at Ganesh Temple, Ranthambhore Fort. People of Rajasthan and outside Rajasthan visit for this fair. Every year 3-4 lacs devotees participates in this fair. This fair is organised for three days.

Chauth Mata Fair
Chauth Mata Temple is about 25 km from the Sawai Madhopur city in Chauth Ka Barwara town.  This fair is organised on Magh Krishna Chaturthi. Lacs of people around Rajasthan and other states visit here for this Fair.

Shiv Ratri Fair
The Ghushmeshwar Mahadev temple is located 3 km from Isarda Railway Station in Kota-Jaipur on the train route to Shiwar Town, at 100 km from Jaipur and 40 km from Sawai Madhopur in Rajasthan, India, near Ranthambore National Park.  Annual fair is organised near the temple during Shiv Ratri.

Rameshwar Dham
The Rameshwaram Temple is 60 km from Sawai Madhopur on the confluence of Banas and Chambal River.  It has a Shiva temple where a fair is held annually on Shiv Ratri.  Lakhs of people Rajasthan and Madhya Pradesh visit here for this Fair.

KalyanJi Fair
Every year the Besakh Shukla Puranmasi fair is organised at Gangapur City for seven days. Thousands of people join this fair.

Chamatkarji fair 
A fair is organised at Chamatkarji on Sharad Purnima.

See also

References

External links

 Official Site

 
Districts of Rajasthan
Districts in Bharatpur division